Chi Cancri, Latinized from χ Cancri, is a candidate  astrometric binary star system in the northern zodiac constellation of Cancer. It has a yellow-white hue and is dimly visible to the naked eye with an apparent visual magnitude of 5.14. The system is located at a distance of 59 light years from the Sun, based on parallax, and is drifting further away with a radial velocity of +33 km/s. It is estimated to have made its closest approach some 274,000 years ago when it came to within .

The visible component of this system is an F-type main-sequence star with a stellar classification of F6V, where the luminosity class of 'V' indicates it is generating energy through core hydrogen fusion. The star is 5.8 billion years old and is spinning with a projected rotational velocity of just 4.2 km/s. It has about the same mass as the Sun but 1.4 times the Sun's radius. Chi Cancri is radiating 2.4 times the luminosity of the Sun from its photosphere at an effective temperature of 6,130 K. It displays an infrared excess in the 18μm wavelength band, suggesting a circumstellar disk of dusty debris is orbiting the star.

References

F-type main-sequence stars
Astrometric binaries
Circumstellar disks

Cancer (constellation)
Cancri, Chi
BD+27 1589
0303
Cancri, 18
069897
040843
003262